Histioea boliviana is a moth of the subfamily Arctiinae. It was described by Herbert Druce in 1890. It is found in Bolivia.

References

Arctiinae
Moths described in 1890